The Waireia River is a river of the Auckland Region of New Zealand's North Island.

See also
List of rivers of New Zealand

References

Rodney Local Board Area
Rivers of the Auckland Region
Kaipara Harbour catchment